Bernard Carl "Bert" Kuczynski (January 8, 1920 – January 19, 1997) was a pitcher for the Philadelphia Athletics of the MLB and an American football tight end in the National Football League for the Detroit Lions and the Philadelphia Eagles. He went to  Northeast High School for high school.  He attended the University of Pennsylvania.  Later he taught social studies and ancient civilizations for 27 years at Catasauqua High School and coached for the district.

External links

1920 births
1997 deaths
Players of American football from Philadelphia
Baseball players from Philadelphia
American football tight ends
Penn Quakers football players
Major League Baseball pitchers
Philadelphia Athletics players
Detroit Lions players
Philadelphia Eagles players
United States Navy personnel of World War II
United States Navy sailors